The Makrani are a Muslim community mainly found in the Indian state of Gujarat. They are said to be descendants of Baloch mercenary soldiers who were brought to Gujarat during the Mughal Empire reign. The name "Makrani" comes from the Makran region of Balochistan where the Makranis are said to have originally came from. Many Makranis today have adopted local Gujarati culture and also speak the Gujarati language. Although, a small minority of Makranis live in Ahmedabad and many of them have migrated to other states in India such as Uttar Pradesh to look for work, the majority of Indian Makranis reside in Kathiawar.

See also

Baluch
Sulaymani Baloch
Makrani people

References 

Social groups of Gujarat
Muslim communities of Gujarat
Baloch diaspora in India